Nelson Elder (January 1923 – 6 February 1983) was a Northern Irish unionist politician.

Early life 
Born in Limavady, Elder worked in a bakery and joined the Northern Ireland Labour Party.  He then defected to the Ulster Unionist Party (UUP) and ran the Welfare and Advice Centre of the Ulster Unionist Council.

Career 
He served as an Ulster Unionist Party (UUP) member of the Senate of Northern Ireland from 1966 to 1972.  In 1967, he attended the founding meeting of the Northern Ireland Civil Rights Association as a representative of the UUP, but he walked out of its founding meeting after failing to convince the organisation that the murder of a police officer merited the death penalty.

Following the abolition of the Senate, Elder was elected at the 1973 Northern Ireland Assembly election, in Belfast South.  On the Assembly, he served as the secretary of the backbench group of Pro-Assembly Unionists.

Elder also served as Secretary of the Unionist Trade Unionist Alliance, and as a member of the B Specials.

References

1923 births
1983 deaths
Members of the Northern Ireland Assembly 1973–1974
Members of the Senate of Northern Ireland 1965–1969
Members of the Senate of Northern Ireland 1969–1973
People from Limavady
Ulster Unionist Party members of the Senate of Northern Ireland